The Watts Mill Bridge is a pin-connected Pratt pony truss bridge located over the Little Beaver Creek in Cannelton, Pennsylvania, United States.

The bridge was constructed in 1878 by the West Penn Bridge Company, based in nearby Beaver Falls PA. The bridge is located in a valley approximately a 1/8 mile west of the North Country National Scenic Trail.  The bridge and adjacent Mill remains were listed on the National Register of Historic Places in 1988.  When the bridge was given this designation by the NRHP, it was simply known as the Bridge in South Beaver Township.  It is the only bridge in Beaver County on the National Register for itself, although the Bridgewater-Rochester Bridge over the Beaver River is part of the Bridgewater Historic District in Bridgewater to the south.

In 2004, the bridge, which was becoming rusty and falling into disrepair and considered for demolition by PennDOT, was placed on the Top Ten Best Historic Preservation Opportunities in the Pittsburgh Area by the Young Preservationists Association of Pittsburgh.

The bridge was removed in 2019 in cooperation with a partnership with Workin' Bridges to rehabilitate the bridge for pedestrian only usage and be able to have continued access to historical and recreational opportunities in the immediate area.

See also
 List of bridges on the National Register of Historic Places in Pennsylvania
 National Register of Historic Places listings in Beaver County, Pennsylvania

References

Road bridges on the National Register of Historic Places in Pennsylvania
Bridges in Beaver County, Pennsylvania
National Register of Historic Places in Beaver County, Pennsylvania
Steel bridges in the United States
Pratt truss bridges in the United States